Valentina Nappi (born 6 November 1990) is an Italian pornographic film actress and adult model.

Life and career 
Born in Scafati, near Salerno, Nappi made her debut in the adult industry in 2011 with director Rocco Siffredi after she contacted him via e-mail.

She graduated from art school in Salerno and, as of October 2013, she studied art and design at a university. Often referred to as an "intellectual pornstar", Nappi wrote several essays on the condition of men and women in contemporary society and attended a philosophy festival.

She was a Playmate in the Italian issue of Playboy in June 2012 and Penthouse Pet of the Month in November 2013. As of March 2015, she writes a column in the political and social magazine MicroMega.

She has been the subject of the documentary Io sono Valentina Nappi (2018).

Personal life 
Nappi identifies as pansexual and as a lifetime atheist. In September 2020, she married Giovanni Lagnese, her life partner since 2009; they have an open relationship.

Awards 
 2016 AVN Award – Best Three-Way Sex Scene - G/G/B in Anikka’s Anal Sluts 
 2017 AVN Award – Best Transsexual Scene in Girl/Boy 2 
 2017 XBIZ Award – Foreign Female Performer of the Year
 2018 XBIZ Europa Award – International Crossover Star
 2019 XRCO Award – Unsung Siren

References

Further reading 
 "Da designer a musa di Siffredi. Valentina Nappi, l'intervista di Affari ", Affaritaliani 
 La Redazione, "Sogno di essere una pornostar", Corriere della Sera

External links 

 
  
 
  
 

1990 births
Living people
Italian pornographic film actresses
Pansexual actresses
Italian LGBT actors
People from the Province of Salerno
Penthouse Pets
Italian female adult models
Italian atheists
Childfree